Mother Machree is a 1928 American silent drama film, directed by John Ford, based on the 1924 work The Story of Mother Machree by Rida Johnson Young about a poor Irish immigrant in America. Rida Johnson Young had invented Mother Machree in the stage show Barry of Ballymoore in 1910. John Wayne had a minor role in the film.

Cast

Production 
The production of the film was a protracted one, the film was originally announced by Fox publicity in June 1926 with filming slated for that September. In November, it was announced that it would be premiered on December 12, 1926, tying in with the marketing campaign of the music and discs of the title song, however its release was ultimately delayed, since Fox had plans to release it with a Movietone synchronised music score and sound effects track.

Release 
In May 1927, it was privately previewed at a Fox sales convention in Atlantic City, along with Sunrise and 7th Heaven (1927) as a showcase of the new Movietone process, and that September a silent version was previewed at the Astoria Theatre in London. By the beginning of 1928, the delays were amounting to around $750,000, and its release was deferred until January 22, 1928 when it was premiered at the Globe Theatre in New York, its delay owing to the release schedule of the Fox Movietone features. The film is also notable for containing the first synchronous sound sequence using the Movietone process in a feature film, a short scene featuring Brian McHugh (Neil Hamilton) singing the title song "Mother Machree," which featured in the original stage show.

Preservation
Only four reels out of seven of this movie survive. Incomplete prints exist (reels one, two and five) in the Library of Congress film archive; and in the UCLA Film and Television Archive film archive (reels two, five and seven); reels three, four and six are presumed lost .

See also 
 List of American films of 1928
 Lost films

References

External links 
 
 

1928 films
American silent feature films
American black-and-white films
1928 drama films
Films directed by John Ford
Fox Film films
Silent American drama films
Early sound films
1920s American films